Taufiq Rahmat (born 18 October 1987) is a Singaporean retired footballer who last played for Woodlands Wellington FC, primarily as a midfielder.

A member of the Singapore-based LionsXII squad which finished second during its inaugural season in the 2012 Malaysia Super League, Taufiq returned to the S.League when it was announced that he had signed for Woodlands Wellington ahead of the 2013 season.

Prior to playing for the LionsXII, Taufiq also turned out for S.League clubs Tanjong Pagar United and Tampines Rovers.

He made his debut for Woodlands Wellington on 21 February 2013 in a 2–2 draw against Warriors F.C., coming on as a second-half substitute for Farizal Basri.

Taufiq retired from professional football at the end of 2013 season.

Club career statistics

Taufiq Rahmat's Profile

All numbers encased in brackets signify substitute appearances.

Appearances in AFC Cup competitions

References

1987 births
Living people
Singaporean footballers
Woodlands Wellington FC players
LionsXII players
Malaysia Super League players
Singapore Premier League players
Tanjong Pagar United FC players
Tampines Rovers FC players
Association football midfielders